I've Been Here Before may refer to:
"I've Been Here Before", a song by Ernie Haase & Signature Sound
"I've Been Here Before", a song by Nural from the album Entitlement
"I've Been Here Before", a song by Sara Groves from the album Floodplain
"Déjà Vu (I've Been Here Before)", a song by Teena Marie from the album Wild and Peaceful